Deudorix kessuma is a butterfly in the family Lycaenidae. It is found in south-east Asia. Larvae feed on Nepenthes species, the first three instars bore into the seed pods.

Subspecies
Deudorix kessuma kessuma (Java)
Deudorix kessuma deliochus Hewitson, 1874 (Burma to Singapore and possibly Indochina)
Deudorix kessuma clearchus (Fruhstorfer, 1912) (Sumbawa, Lombok)
Deudorix kessuma throana (Fruhstorfer, 1914) (Borneo and possibly Sumatra)

References

Butterflies described in 1829
Deudorigini
Butterflies of Borneo
Deudorix